In music theory, limit or harmonic limit is a way of characterizing the harmony found in a piece or genre of music, or the harmonies that can be made using a particular scale. The term limit was introduced by Harry Partch, who used it to give an upper bound on the complexity of harmony; hence the name.

The harmonic series and the evolution of music

Harry Partch, Ivor Darreg, and Ralph David Hill are among the many microtonalists to suggest that music has been slowly evolving to employ higher and higher harmonics in its constructs (see emancipation of the dissonance). In medieval music, only chords made of octaves and perfect fifths (involving relationships among the first three harmonics) were considered consonant. In the West, triadic harmony arose (contenance angloise) around the time of the Renaissance, and triads quickly became the fundamental building blocks of Western music. The major and minor thirds of these triads invoke relationships among the first five harmonics.

Around the turn of the 20th century, tetrads debuted as fundamental building blocks in African-American music. In conventional music theory pedagogy, these seventh chords are usually explained as chains of major and minor thirds. However, they can also be explained as coming directly from harmonics greater than 5. For example, the dominant seventh chord in 12-ET approximates 4:5:6:7, while the major seventh chord approximates 8:10:12:15.

Odd-limit and prime-limit
In just intonation, intervals between pitches are drawn from the rational numbers. Since Partch, two distinct formulations of the limit concept have emerged: odd limit and prime limit. Odd limit and prime limit n do not include the same intervals even when n is an odd prime.

Odd limit
For a positive odd number n, the n-odd-limit contains all rational numbers such that the largest odd number that divides either the numerator or denominator is not greater than n.

In Genesis of a Music, Harry Partch considered just intonation rationals according to the size of their numerators and denominators, modulo octaves. Since octaves correspond to factors of 2, the complexity of any interval may be measured simply by the largest odd factor in its ratio. Partch's theoretical prediction of the sensory dissonance of intervals (his "One-Footed Bride") are very similar to those of theorists including Hermann von Helmholtz, William Sethares, and Paul Erlich.

See , below.

Identity

An identity is each of the odd numbers below and including the (odd) limit in a tuning. For example, the identities included in 5-limit tuning are 1, 3, and 5. Each odd number represents a new pitch in the harmonic series and may thus be considered an identity:
   C    C    G    C    E    G  ...
   2    4    6    8    10  12 ...

According to Partch: "The number 9, though not a prime, is nevertheless an identity in music, simply because it is an odd number." Partch defines "identity" as "one of the correlatives, 'major' or 'minor', in a tonality; one of the odd-number ingredients, one or several or all of which act as a pole of tonality".

Odentity and udentity are short for over-identity and under-identity, respectively. According to music software producer Tonalsoft: "An udentity is an identity of an utonality".

Prime limit

For a prime number n, the n-prime-limit contains all rational numbers that can be factored using primes no greater than n. In other words, it is the set of rationals with numerator and denominator both n-smooth.

In the late 1970s, a new genre of music began to take shape on the West coast of the United States, known as the American gamelan school. Inspired by Indonesian gamelan, musicians in California and elsewhere began to build their own gamelan instruments, often tuning them in just intonation. The central figure of this movement was the American composer Lou Harrison. Unlike Partch, who often took scales directly from the harmonic series, the composers of the American Gamelan movement tended to draw scales from the just intonation lattice, in a manner like that used to construct Fokker periodicity blocks. Such scales often contain ratios with very large numbers, that are nevertheless related by simple intervals to other notes in the scale.

Prime-limit tuning and intervals are often referred to using the term for the numeral system based on the limit. For example, 7-limit tuning and intervals are called septimal, 11-limit is called undecimal, and so on.

Examples

Beyond just intonation
In musical temperament, the simple ratios of just intonation are mapped to nearby irrational approximations. This operation, if successful, does not change the relative harmonic complexity of the different intervals, but it can complicate the use of the harmonic limit concept. Since some chords (such as the diminished seventh chord in 12-ET) have several valid tunings in just intonation, their harmonic limit may be ambiguous.

See also
 3-limit (Pythagorean) tuning
 Five-limit tuning
 7-limit tuning
 Numerary nexus
 Otonality and Utonality
 Tonality diamond
 Tonality flux

References

External links
 "Limits: Consonance Theory Explained", Glen Peterson's Musical Instruments and Tuning Systems.
 "Harmonic Limit", Xenharmonic.

Harmony
Harry Partch